
Chaturbhuj is a Hindu temple excavated in a rock face in the Gwalior Fort, in c875 AD, by Alla, the son of Vaillabhatta, and the grandson of Nagarabhatta a nagar brahmin in present-day Madhya Pradesh, India.

One of the temples inscriptions contains the earliest known inscription of the circular symbol "O", to represent zero, in India, though the Bakhshali manuscript is regarded as the earliest existent use of zero. The inscription states, among other things, that the community planted a garden of 187 hastas by 270 hastas (1 hasta = 1.5 feet), that the garden yielded 50 garlands for the temple every day. The last digits of 270 and 50 are "O" shaped. While Indian and non-Indian texts mention zero much earlier, this temple has the earliest known epigraphical evidence inscribed in stone that already knows and uses the concept of zero.

It is a relative small temple with a square plan of  side. The temple has a portico at its entrance supported by four carved pillars. The pillars show reliefs of individuals meditating in yoga asana position, as well as amorous couples. To the right of the portico is covered pillared mandapa, like a choultry. The doorway into the rock is flanked by goddess Ganga and Yamuna. The ceiling of the temple is a low square pyramid, similar to the Dhamnar temple. The tower (Shikhara) of the temple is North Indian Nagara style, that slowly curves with a square plan, all carved out of the monolithic rock. It has an inscription that opens with a praise for Vishnu (Vaishnavism), then Shiva (Shaivism) and nine Durgas (Shaktism), as well states that it was excavated in 876 CE (Samvat 933). Inside there is a wall relief of Varaha (Vishnu's man-boar avatar) and another of four armed Vishnu. It also a carving of goddess Lakshmi with four arms. The name of the temple may be derived from four armed Vishnu and Lakshmi.

The temple is partially damaged, its tower has been restored, and much of the interior artwork is missing.

Gallery

See also
Siddhachal Caves
Telika Mandir

References

External links

You Can Visit the World’s Oldest Zero at a Temple in India, Smithsonian magazine (shows the zero inscription)

Buildings and structures in Gwalior
Temples in Madhya Pradesh
Tourist attractions in Gwalior